Pedro Miguel Simoes Fragoso Dias (born 7 June 1973), also known as Chiquinho, is a Portuguese retired football player and a current manager.

Player 
Born in Lisbon, Chiquinho began playing football at the youth level with GDRT Petrogal in 1984. He moved to Sport Grupo Sacavenense and eventually Sporting Clube of Portugal signed him two-year contract. In 1992, Chiquinho was loaned to Sporting Clube Lourinhanense in the Portuguese Second Division. The following year he was loaned out to S.C.U. Torreense of the Segunda Liga. After finishing his contract with Sporting CP he signed with CD Nacional where he played for 4 seasons.

After that he signed with Portimonense S.C., and signed Clube Desportivo Ribeira Brava in 1999. In 2000, he signed with Associação Desportiva de São Vicente. He would finish off his career with Centro Social de Camâra de Lobos and with Estrela Da Calheta Futebol Clube in 2005.

Manager 
Pedro Dias started coaching at CD Nacional, remaining 1 year. From 2007 to 2010 he was in charge of Benfica Soccer Schools and Beira-Mar FC in Toronto youth Clubs and Soccer Academies.

In 2010–11 Dias was appointed Youth Technical Director of CS Maritimo until he returned to Canada, in May 2011, to lead the Sporting FC Academy.

References

External links 
 
 Ontario Soccer

1973 births
Living people
Association football forwards
Portuguese footballers
C.D. Nacional players
S.C.U. Torreense players
Portimonense S.C. players
SC Toronto players
Canadian Soccer League (1998–present) players
Liga Portugal 2 players
Footballers from Lisbon